Catherina McKiernan (born 30 November 1969 in Cornafean, County Cavan) is a former long-distance runner from Ireland, who competed in the marathon, 10,000 metres and cross country running.

Biography
McKiernan has held the Women's national record for the Marathon since 1998 when she achieved a time of 2:22.23 in the Amsterdam marathon. She has also held the national record for 15km and the half marathon since 1997.

As of 2012, McKiernan is a running instructor that offers workshops on the technique of ChiRunning.

Achievements
1992
World Cross Country Championships silver medal
1993
World Cross Country Championships silver medal
1994
World Cross Country Championships silver medal
European Cross Country Championships gold medal
1995
World Cross Country Championships silver medal
1997
World Cross Country Championships team bronze medal
Berlin Marathon winner (fastest ever debut marathon by a woman)
Dublin Women's Mini Marathon winner
1998
London Marathon winner
Amsterdam Marathon winner
Dublin Women's Mini Marathon winner
Lisbon Half Marathon winner.
1999
Dublin Women's Mini Marathon winner
Paris Half Marathon winner.
2004
Dublin Women's Mini Marathon winner

As well as appearing on the international stage Catherina has won national titles at:
3000m (4): 1990-1993
5000m (1): 1996
cross country (3): 1990-1992

References

External links

Four times World Cross medallist McKiernan to retire from IAAF

1969 births
20th-century Irish people
21st-century Irish people
Living people
Irish female long-distance runners
Irish female marathon runners
London Marathon female winners
Sportspeople from County Cavan
Athletes (track and field) at the 1992 Summer Olympics
Athletes (track and field) at the 1996 Summer Olympics
Olympic athletes of Ireland
World Athletics Championships athletes for Ireland
European Cross Country Championships winners